Ifrane National Park is a national park located in the Middle Atlas mountain range, in Morocco. Its territory extends over the Western part of the Middle Atlas mountains and areas within the provinces of Ifrane and Boulmane. Much of the park is forested with Atlas cedar. Ifrane National Park is one of the few remaining habitats for the Barbary macaque, Macaca sylvanus; this primate prehistorically had a much broader range in North Africa, but currently survives as an endangered species in narrowly restricted and fragmented habitats.

Creation

Ifrane National Park was conceived in 1994 and established in October 2004 due to many reasons such as the existence of remarkable species in the territory, the presence of internationally important ecosystems, and the increase of human activity and resource exploitation.

Since the 1990s, Morocco got involved in the conception of strategies that can help in protecting the environment and biodiversity through projects and conventions such as Ramsar. Ifrane National Park is one of the strategies that the Moroccan state came up with in order to demonstrate the importance of its forests and ecosystems.

Territory

The zone encompasses some of the most ecologically sensitive areas such as wetlands and high-altitude forests. It is believed that the park's altitude varies between  including the cedar forest located in the province of Ifrane.

It was stated that the park contains one tenth of the Atlas Cedar in the world, one fourth of the world's population of the Barbary Macaque, and two Ramsar sites: the two lakes Afennourir and Tifounassine.

Additionally, included in Ifrane National Park's territory are the following 'daiyat', as in lakes, and forests: 
 Dait Aoua
 Dait Hachlaf
 Dait Ifrah
 Tallount
 Kharzouza
 Ain Kahla

Natural reserve
The park constitutes a very important natural reserve to Morocco since it is biologically and geologically diverse. The park was created with these three intentions:
 protecting biodiversity and ecosystems
 raising awareness of the environment and eco-tourism 
 sustainable development of natural resources

Climate
Located in the Atlas Mountains, and affected by the cold north Atlantic current, Ifrane National Park has a continental-influenced warm-summer Mediterranean climate (Csb) with short, somewhat dry, warm summers and long, cool, damp winters. The nights can be severely cold in winter. The winter highs rarely exceed  in December–February. 

Because of its elevation, the area experiences snow during the winter months and a cooler climate during the summer (not as hot as in the nearby regions).

Owing to the area's elevation and proximity to the north Atlantic Ocean, rainfall is very heavy whenever frontal systems affect the region. Precipitation patterns follow the classic Mediterranean range, from October to April. The park also receives high snowfall starting as early as October and lasting well into spring season. The annual average temperature does not exceed .

The city of Ifrane holds the record of the lowest temperature ever observed in Africa:  on February 11, 1935.

Flora

The area has 1015 different plant species including the Atlas Cedar (Cedrus Atlantica), the Evergreen Oak (Quercus Ilex), the Algerian Oak (Quercus Canariensis), the Maritime Pine (Pinus Pinaster), and the Spanish Juniper (Juniperus Thunifera). Other tree species that exist in the park include the Montpellier maple, the yew, and the holly.

Fauna

The park contains a rich fauna. It constitutes a natural living environment for the endangered monkey species the Barbary Macaque. Moreover, in the park one can find wild Barbary boars ( Sus scrofa algira ), the African wolf (Canis lupaster), the striped hyenas (Hyaena hyaena), the Barbary stag (Cervus elaphus barbarus), the arruis ( Ammotragus lervia), red foxes (Vulpes vulpes), the serval ( Leptailurus serval constantinus ), the caracal (Caracal caracal algira), the European otter ( Lutra lutra ), the European rabbit ( Oryctolagus cuniculus ), the crested porcupine ( Hystrix cristata ), the cape hare ( Lepus capensis ) the common genet (Genetta genetta)  and probably the Barbary leopard (Panthera pardus pardus).

In addition, the park is a place where various bird species keep showing up. In fact, Afennourir Lake is a Ramsar Site where you can find a shelter for bird-watching. The bird species that can be found in the lake include coots, also called Fulica, snipes, and egrets.

Reintroduction projects
In 2021, to celebrate World Biodiversity Day, in the Ifrane National Park, 31  arruis and 6  crested porcupine were reintroduced. In 2021 to Friday June 4, 28  arruis were reintroduced.

Notes

References
 Plan d’Aménagement et de Gestion du Parc National du Parc National National d’Ifrane.(2007).  Haut Commissariat aux Eaux et Forets et à la Lutte contre la Desertification.
 Parc national d’Ifran (2012). Ecologie.ma. Retrieved from http://www.ecologie.ma/parc-national-difran/ 
 Parc National d’Ifrane – Pays d’Accueil Touristique (2015). Ifrane: la cure de jouvence. Retrieved from http://www.tourisme-dpt-ifrane.ma/parc-difrane-et-pat
 Parc National d'Ifrane – Centre d'Echange d'Information sur la Biodiversité du Maroc
 Anthony Ham, Paula Hardy and Alison Bing. 2007. Morocco, Lonely Planet Publications, Paul Clammer  . 528 pages
 C. Michael Hogan. 2008. Barbary Macaque: Macaca sylvanus, GlobalTwitcher.com, ed. N. Stromberg

National parks of Morocco
Ramsar sites in Morocco
Protected areas established in 1942
Atlas Mountains